Irina Lăcrămioara Lepșa (born 6 June 1992) is a Romanian weightlifter.

References

External links 
 
 

1992 births
Living people 
Romanian female weightlifters
European Weightlifting Championships medalists
21st-century Romanian women